HMS Plumper was part of the 1847 Program, she was ordered on the 25 of April as a steam schooner from Woolwich Dockyard with the name Pincher. However, the reference Ships of the Royal Navy, by J.J. College, (c) 2020 there is no entry that associates this name to this build. The vessel was reordered on August 12 as an 8-gun sloop as designed by John Fincham, Master Shipwright at Portsmouth. Launched in 1848, she served three commissions, firstly on the West Indies and North American Station, then on the West Africa Station and finally in the Pacific Station. It was during her last commission as a survey ship that she left her most enduring legacy; in charting the west coast of British Columbia she left her name and those of her ship's company scattered across the charts of the region. She paid off for the last time in 1861 and was finally sold for breaking up in 1865.

Plumper was the fifth named vessel since it was introduced for a 12-gun gunvessel launched by Randall of Rotherhithe on 17 May 1794 and sold in January 1802.

Construction
Plumper’s keel was laid in October 1847 at Portsmouth Dockyard and launched on 5 April 1848. Her builder's measure tonnage was 490 tons and displaced 577 tons.

Her machinery was supplied by Miller, Ravenhill & Company. She shipped two rectangular fire tube boilers.

Her main armament consisted of two Blomefield 32-pounder 56 hundredweight (cwt) muzzle loading smooth bore (MLSB) 9.5-foot solid shot guns and six Blomefield (bored up from 18-pounders) 32-pounder 25 cwt MLSB 6-foot solid shot guns on broadside trucks.

Trials
During steam trials her engine generated 148 indicated horsepower (IHP) for a speed of 7.4 knots.

Plumper was completed for sea on the 17th of December 1848 at a cost of £20,446.

Commissioned Service

First commission (1848–1853)
She was commissioned on 6 November 1848 under Commander Matthew S. Nolloth, RN for Particular Service with Admiral Sir Charles Napier’s Western Squadron. In January 1849 she was sent to the North America and West Indies Station. Curiously, a report was published in the Illustrated London News on 14 April 1849 of a sighting of a sea serpent off the Portuguese Coast.

On 25 June 1850, she ran aground and was damaged off Digby, Nova Scotia, British North America. She was refloated and taken in to Digby for repairs. In June 1851 she deployed to the south-east coast of America and during this period she captured the slavers Flor-do-Mar on 14 June 1851 and Sarah on 9 June 1851 (with HMS Cormorant).

She paid off at Portsmouth on 6 January 1853.

Second commission (1853–1856)
After a short refit she recommissioned at Portsmouth under Commander John A.L. Wharton, RN on 1 August 1853 for service on the West Coast of Africa. At the time, the West Africa Squadron was employed overwhelmingly in anti-slavery patrols. She changed commanders on 5 April 1855 when Commander William H. Haswell took command. The London Gazette records the capture of a slaving vessel of unknown name by Plumper on 19 October 1855. By October 1856 her gun armament was increased to 12 guns. She returned to Home Waters paying off at Portsmouth on 9 December 1856.

Third commission (1857–1861)

She recommissioned at Portsmouth on 10 December 1856 under Captain George Henry Richards, RN for service on the Pacific Coast of British North America as a survey ship. During her tenure there she surveyed the lower Fraser River, Burrard Inlet, Howe Sound, Sunshine Coast and the waters around Esquimalt and Victoria on Vancouver's Island. The Plumper, having embarked a company of Royal Marines, was involved in the Pig War crisis between the United States and Britain in 1859; along with Tribune, which was commanded by Captain Geoffrey Hornby, the Plumper and HMS Satellite were dispatched by Governor James Douglas to prevent American soldiers from erecting fortifications on San Juan Island and bringing in reinforcements.

Francis Brockton was the ship's engineer under Captain Richards when, in 1859, Brockton found a vein of coal in the Vancouver area. After the discovery, which Richards reported to Governor James Douglas, Richards named the area of the find Coal Harbour and named Brockton Point, at the east end of what is now Stanley Park in Vancouver, after Francis Brockton.

Commander Anthony Hoskins brought HMS Hecate out to the Pacific Station and swapped commands with Richards, taking command of the Plumper in January 1861. He then returned to the United Kingdom, paying the ship off at Portsmouth on 2 July 1861.

Disposal
Plumper was sold to White of Cowes for breaking on 2 June 1865.

Legacy
Several significant features of the coast of British Columbia are named after Plumper, including Plumper Sound in the Southern Gulf Islands region of British Columbia and Plumper Cove at Keats Island (from which Plumper Cove Marine Provincial Park takes its name). Other features were named after the ship's company, including:

Campbell River, British Columbia for Dr Samuel Campbell, the ship's surgeon.
Pender Island and Pender Harbour, British Columbia for Daniel Pender.
Mayne Island for Lieutenant Richard Charles Mayne.
Brockton Point for the ship's engineer, Francis Brockton.
Mudge Island for William Fitzwilliam Mudge, a ship's officer.

An image of the ship appears on the coat-of-arms of the town of Sidney on southern Vancouver Island.

Citations

References
 Lyon Winfield, The Sail & Steam Navy List, All the Ships of the Royal Navy 1815 to 1889, by David Lyon & Rif Winfield, published by Chatham Publishing, London © 2004, 
 The Navy List, published by His Majesty's Stationery Office, London
 Winfield, British Warships in the Age of Sail (1817 – 1863), by Rif Winfield, published by Seaforth Publishing, England © 2014, e, Chapter 12 Screw Sloops, Vessels ordered or reordered as steam screw sloops (from 1845), Plumper
 Colledge, Ships of the Royal Navy, by J.J. Colledge, revised and updated by Lt Cdr Ben Warlow and Steve Bush, published by Seaforth Publishing, Barnsley, Great Britain, © 2020, e  (EPUB), Section P (Plumper, Pincher)

 

Victorian-era sloops of the United Kingdom
Sloops of the Royal Navy
Survey vessels of the Royal Navy
Ships built in Portsmouth
Pre-Confederation British Columbia
1848 ships